Salvador Durán Sánchez (born 6 May 1985) is a Mexican race car driver who raced in the FIA Formula E Championship for the Amlin Aguri team. Durán has also previously competed in A1 Grand Prix, Formula Renault 3.5, and the NASCAR Toyota Series.

Career

Born in Mexico City, Durán started his career in 2002 with a 2nd place in the Skip Barber National and winning the Midwestern Champion trophy. In 2003 he finished 8th in Italian Formula Renault and 15th in the Formula Renault Eurocup. In 2004 and 2005, he drove in the British F3 International Series National Class with P1 Motorsport, becoming class winner in 2005.

On the back of this success, he signed up for the 2005-06 A1 Grand Prix season, contesting some of the race weekends for Team Mexico, winning both races of the USA round at Laguna Seca.

For the 2006 British F3 International Series, Salvador moved up to the Championship Class, with Hitech Racing, finishing tenth in the championship, scoring 54 points, with his best result a fourth place at Silverstone.

He then went on to commit to the second season of A1 Grand Prix. He also was a member of the winning team for Chip Ganassi Racing in the 2007 24 Hours of Daytona, along with teammates Juan Pablo Montoya and Scott Pruett.

He raced 2009 for the Mexican A1GP team the last 4 races having in the last race a top 3 as best result and making Mexico enter the top 10 in the championship, he raced in the 2010 NASCAR Mexico Series for Citizen-DHL team having a pole position and two top 3 finishes he ended up out of the top 20 and was excluded in 3 races.

In December 2014 Amlin Aguri announced that Durán would drive for them in the 2014 Punta del Este ePrix in Uruguay, the third round of the 2014 Formula E season. He replaced Katherine Legge, who was testing at Daytona.

For the 2015–16 Formula E season, Durán signed with Trulli GP, but after the team's withdrawal from the formula after the first three rounds of the championship (in which they not competed), Salvador rejoined Team Aguri. Following the next three races, at the Paris ePrix, Durán was replaced by Chinese driver Ma Qing Hua, who stayed on the team for the remainder of the season.

Racing record

Career summary

† Team standings.
‡ As Durán was a guest driver, he was ineligible to score points.

American Open-Wheel racing results
(key)

Barber Dodge Pro Series

Complete Formula Renault 3.5 Series results
(key) (Races in bold indicate pole position; races in italics indicate fastest lap)

Complete A1 Grand Prix results
(key) (Races in bold indicate pole position; races in italics indicate fastest lap)

24 Hours of Daytona

Complete Formula E results
(key) (Races in bold indicate pole position; races in italics indicate fastest lap)

References

External links

 
 
 
British F3 Profile of Salvador Durán

1985 births
Living people
Racing drivers from Mexico City
Mexican racing drivers
North American Formula Renault drivers
Latin America Formula Renault 2000 drivers
Italian Formula Renault 2.0 drivers
Formula Renault Eurocup drivers
A1 Team Mexico drivers
British Formula Three Championship drivers
24 Hours of Daytona drivers
World Series Formula V8 3.5 drivers
Barber Pro Series drivers
Formula E drivers
NASCAR drivers
A1 Grand Prix drivers
Rolex Sports Car Series drivers
Team Aguri drivers
Chip Ganassi Racing drivers
P1 Motorsport drivers
Hitech Grand Prix drivers
Cram Competition drivers
Super Nova Racing drivers
DAMS drivers
Campos Racing drivers